The Porcupine Lake Wilderness is a  tract of protected land located in Bayfield County, Wisconsin, managed by the United States Forest Service.  The Wilderness is located within the boundaries of the Chequamegon–Nicolet National Forest.

Porcupine Lake
Porcupine Lake is just one of the over 10 lakes that can be found in the Wilderness.

Flora and Fauna
There are several different types of trees residing in the Wilderness, the most prominent being Oak, Maple, Hemlock, and White Pine. In addition to the varied flora, in both Porcupine Lake and Eighteen Mile Spring Pond, trout, bass, and northern pike are commonly found. Besides sea dwelling fauna, deer, bears, foxes, and loons have been known to frequent the area.

See also
List of wilderness areas of the United States

References

External Links
 U.S. Geological Survey Map at the U.S. Geological Survey Map Website. Retrieved February 24th, 2022.

Protected areas of Wisconsin
Geography of Bayfield County, Wisconsin
Protected areas established in 1984
1984 establishments in Wisconsin